The 1948 Singapore Open, also known as the 1948 Singapore Badminton Championships, took place from 14 August – 27 November 1948 at the Clerical Union Hall in Balestier, Singapore. The ties were played over a few months with the first round ties being played on the 14 of August and last (the men's doubles finals) was played on 27 November.

Venue
Clerical Union Hall

Final results

References 

Singapore Open (badminton)
1948 in badminton